Thunder Soul is a 2010 American documentary film produced and directed by Mark Landsman. The film features narration by Jamie Foxx and stars Conrad Johnson. The film premiered at South by Southwest in 2010.

Synopsis
A former Kashmere High School graduate return home after 35 years to play a tribute concert for his beloved band leader, who, during the 1970s, turned the struggling jazz band, Kashmere Stage Band, into a world-class funk powerhouse.

Reception
On review aggregator website Rotten Tomatoes, the film has a 100% approval rating based on 29 reviews, with an average ranking of 7.9/10. On Metacritic, the film has a weighted average score of 81 out of a 100 based on 24 reviews, indicating "universal acclaim".

Joe Leydon of Variety wrote "Thunder Soul offers a heaping helping of uplift".

Marjorie Baumgarten of The Austin Chronicle wrote "[The film] tells the story of the Kashmere Stage Band, and before the film is through, this high school band you've never heard of will have earned a top spot on your personal hit parade".

According to Sheri Linden of the Los Angeles Times, "Though [the film] sometimes overplays the sentimentality, [it] gets not just the music but also the sense of possibility for this post-civil-rights generation".

Nathan Rabin of The A.V. Club criticized the filmmakers for not being "interested in peering beneath the dazzling surface". According to him, despite portraying Johnson as a "benign dictator", "[the film] represents a feast for the senses, a soulful celebration of the black musical renaissance of the late '60s and '70s".

Kirk Honeycutt of The Hollywood Reporter called Thunder Soul "[a] genuinely moving and powerful doc[umentary] about one of the great funk bands ever, that just happened to be a high school band".

References

External links

Kashmere Stage Band

American documentary films
Documentaries about music
Documentary films about musical groups
2010 documentary films
Roadside Attractions films
Lionsgate films
Miramax films
Films shot in Texas
2010s English-language films
2010s American films